"I Get the Fever' is a 1966 single by Bill Anderson.  "I Get the Fever" was Bill Anderson's third number one on the country charts.  The single spent one week at number one and a total of nineteen weeks on the country charts.

Chart performance

References

1966 singles
Bill Anderson (singer) songs
Songs written by Bill Anderson (singer)
Song recordings produced by Owen Bradley
1966 songs
Decca Records singles